Ji-Yeon Yuh is an American reporter, writer, editor and professor in Asian American history and Asian diasporas at the Northwestern University. Since 2005, Yuh is the director of Program in Asian American Studies at Northwestern University.

Yuh is a co-founder and National Spokesperson of the organization the Alliance of Scholars Concerned about Korea.

Biography
Yuh studied at Erasmus Society of the Latin School of Chicago in 1983. She received her B.S. in Cognitive Science at Stanford University in 1987; her Ph.D. from the Department of History at University of Pennsylvania in 1999

Career: from reporting and teaching
After her graduation from Stanford University, Yuh worked as a reporter at The Omaha World-Herald, Omaha, NE from September 1987 to May 1989. Since then she have had several short-term engagements as a reporter with Newsday, New York, NY: from June to September 1987, May 1989 to July 1990. In 1991 from June to September, she was an editorial board member and writer at The Philadelphia Inquirer, Philadelphia, PA.

Upon her graduation from University of Pennsylvania, she started her teaching and research career in Asian American Studies at Northwestern University, and serves as a director at the Asian American Studies Program.

She is the author of book Beyond the Shadow of Camptown: Korean Military Brides in America, which chronicled the history of Korean women who immigrated to the United States as the wives of U.S. soldiers and examines the dynamics of race, culture, gender and nationalism from the perspective of Korean military brides.

Selected publications

Books
 Beyond the Shadow of Camptown: Korean Military Brides in America, New York University Press, 2002

Selected articles
 “Moved By War: Migration, Diaspora, and the Korean War.” Journal of Asian American Studies, Vol. 8, No. 3, Oct. 2005. pp. 277–292.
 “Imagined Community: Sisterhood and Resistance Among Korean Military Brides,” in Asian Pacific Islander American Women: A Historical Anthology, edited by Shirley Hune and Gail Nomura, New York University Press, 2003, pp. 221–236.

Awards
 Peabody Award for the radio documentary, “Crossing East,” (consulting scholar), 2006
 Milestone Maker Award, Asian American Institute, 2004

References

External links
 the Alliance of Scholars Concerned about Korea
 A Graduate Student’s Reflection on Studying Asian American History

Living people
American writers of Korean descent
American educators
American sociologists
American women sociologists
University of Pennsylvania School of Arts and Sciences alumni
Stanford University alumni
Year of birth missing (living people)
21st-century American women